José Manuel Rodríguez Morgade (born 22 June 1984), commonly known as Manu, is a Swiss professional footballer who plays for Ourense CF mainly as a left-back.

Club career
Born in Wädenswil, Switzerland to Spanish immigrants, Manu started playing with CD Ourense in the Segunda División B. He remained in that level the following eight seasons, signing in summer 2007 with Galician neighbours CD Lugo.

In the 2011–12 campaign, Manu contributed 43 matches (all starts) and five goals as the club promoted to Segunda División for the second time in its history, the first in 20 years. He made his debut in the competition on 18 August 2012 in a 1–0 home win against Hércules CF, scoring the game's only goal through a penalty kick; he served as team captain for several seasons.

On 4 July 2017, after one decade with Lugo, free agent Manu joined fellow second-tier side Cultural y Deportiva Leonesa. The following 25 January, he signed for Elche CF of the third division after severing ties with the former.

Manu continued competing in the lower leagues until his retirement, with Coruxo FC and Ourense CF.

Career statistics

Club

References

External links

1984 births
Living people
People from Wädenswil
Swiss men's footballers
Swiss people of Spanish descent
Association football defenders
Association football midfielders
Association football utility players
Segunda División players
Segunda División B players
Segunda Federación players
CD Ourense footballers
CD Lugo players
Cultural Leonesa footballers
Elche CF players
Coruxo FC players